19th parallel may refer to:

19th parallel north, a circle of latitude in the Northern Hemisphere
19th parallel south, a circle of latitude in the Southern Hemisphere